Alaina is a feminine given name. Notable people with the name include: 
Alaina Burnett (born 1977), Canadian voice actor from Vancouver, British Columbia, Canada
Alaina Capri (born 1939), Russ Meyer actress who appeared in Common Law Cabin and Good Morning and... Goodbye!
Alaina Huffman (born 1980), Canadian film and television actress, also known professionally as Alaina Kalanj
Alaina Johnson (born 1990), American artistic gymnast
Alaina Lockhart (born 1974), Canadian politician
Alaina Reed Hall (1946–2009), American actress best known for her roles as Olivia on the TV series Sesame Street

See also 
Alanna
Elaine (given name)

Feminine given names
English feminine given names